Justin James Hayward-Young (born 2 May 1987) is an English musician. He is currently the lead singer and guitarist of indie rock band The Vaccines.

Early life 
Young was born in Hampshire, England, and grew up in the New Forest. He attended King Edward VI School in Southampton from 1998-2003 and Brockenhurst College from 2003-2005. He is a great-grandson of the prolific English painter and artist Walter Hayward-Young, who was commonly known as "Jotter". The son of a film-maker, he grew up in a "musical household" and began playing music by borrowing his father's guitars.

In June 2010, Young graduated from King's College London with a degree in History.

Career 

During his early teens Young played in various bands, including an alt-country band called The Eldora Parade and a hardcore punk band called Fashion Police Brutality.

Arriving in London for University, Young began playing solo and performed regularly under the stage name Jay Jay Pistolet, appearing on bills with Florence & The Machine, Kid Harpoon and Frank Turner. Young is mentioned by name in two of Frank Turner's songs: "Justin is the last of the great romantic poets, And he's the only one among us who is ever going to make it" (I Knew Prufrock Before He Got Famous, 2008), "And Justin left Southampton and got famous like I said" (The Resurrectionists, 2022).

As Jay Jay Pistolet, Young released a single entitled "We Are Free" with Chess Club Records in 2007 and an EP called Happy Birthday You in 2008 through Stiff Records. He toured frequently with peers Laura Marling, Slow Club and Johnny Flynn, and opened for acts such as Okkervil River, Tilly & The Wall and Jay Reatard.

In December 2008, Young announced that he would be no longer be performing as Jay Jay Pistolet.

In 2010, he started his current band, The Vaccines, along with bandmates Freddie Cowan, Árni Árnason and Pete Robertson and gained worldwide success.

In late 2019, Young announced his side project, Halloweens, with his bandmate Timothy Lanham, also from The Vaccines.

In 2022, Young co-produced five tracks on Alfie Templeman's debut album Mellow Moon.

Personal life 
During his early twenties, Young lived with three other musicians in Chelsea, London: Marcus Mumford and Winston Marshall of the band Mumford and Sons, and Alan Pownall of electro outfit Pale. Mumford was a frequent early collaborator with Young as Jay Jay Pistolet, performing on recordings and playing in his band.

In 2011, Young underwent three separate throat operations to treat haemorrhaging due to recurrent vocal polyps.

In 2013, Young moved to New York City.

Young is a Manchester United fan.

References

1987 births
Living people
Alumni of King's College London
English rock singers
21st-century English singers